The State Register of Heritage Places is maintained by the Heritage Council of Western Australia. , 141 places are heritage-listed in the Shire of Denmark, of which three are on the State Register of Heritage Places.

List

State Register of Heritage Places
The Western Australian State Register of Heritage Places, lists the following three state registered places within the Shire of Denmark:

Shire of Denmark heritage-listed places
The following places are heritage listed in the Shire of Denmark but are not State registered:

References

Denmark
Denmark